The 2007 New York Yankees season  was the Yankees' 105th. The season started with the Yankees trying to win the AL East championship, a title they had won every season since the 1998 season, but ultimately they came in second place to the Boston Red Sox. The Yankees instead won the American League wild card, beating out the Seattle Mariners and the Detroit Tigers.

Offseason
The offseason started with news of the unexpected death of Cory Lidle, who was an occupant in his own plane that crashed into a Manhattan high rise shortly after the Yankees were eliminated in the 2006 ALDS.  The Yankees made news by trading right fielder Gary Sheffield to the Detroit Tigers in exchange for pitching prospects.  The Yankees also traded away pitcher Jaret Wright
to the Baltimore Orioles in exchange for reliever Chris Britton.  On December 21, 2006, Andy Pettitte signed as a free agent with the Yankees. However, no offseason move was bigger for the team than trading Randy Johnson back to the Arizona Diamondbacks, the team who he was with when he won the 2001 World Series against the Yankees, for pitcher Luis Vizcaíno and three minor league prospects. Joe Torre is managing the team for the 12th consecutive season.

Regular season

Season summary

April
Injuries sidelined starting pitchers Mike Mussina, Carl Pavano, and Chien-Ming Wang, leaving only original starters Andy Pettitte and Kei Igawa active.  The team set a major league record with 10 different starters in the first 30 games, including a record 6 rookies.  Even the rookie hurlers were not immune in the early going.  Jeff Karstens was hit by a line drive off his first pitch on April 28, fracturing his right fibula.  Phil Hughes pitched a hitless  innings against the Rangers on May 1 before leaving the game with a pulled hamstring.  Closer Mariano Rivera blew 2 of his first 3 save opportunities and struggled in other appearances.  Kei Igawa, acquired during the off-season for $46 million from Japan's Hanshin Tigers, allowed 26 earned runs in 6 appearances for an ERA of 7.63. He was then sent to the Tampa Yankees, the Single A affiliate of the Yankees.

Meanwhile, the offense led the American League in hits, home runs, and runs scored.  Alex Rodríguez tied a record (set by Albert Pujols), by hitting 14 home runs in April.  Nonetheless, the Yankees suffered a seven-game losing streak after sweeping the Cleveland Indians at Yankee Stadium and ended April with a record of 9–14, last place in the AL East and  games behind the Red Sox.

May
By early May, Mike Mussina and Chien-Ming Wang joined Andy Pettitte with newcomers Darrell Rasner and Matt DeSalvo filling in the remaining two positions in the rotation.  Alex Rodriguez's remarkable April had come to an end, but the bats kept up their pace and, with the bullpen getting some needed rest, the Yankees began May 7–2.  However, at the end of the month, the Yankees were tied for last place with the Devil Rays and were 22–29,  games behind the Red Sox in the AL East. On May 6, Roger Clemens announced his return to the Yankees after a three-year absence from the team.

June
The Yankees began June with a strong 8–2 start. They opened with a series victory over the Red Sox in Boston, including a game-winning home run by Alex Rodriguez off closer Jonathan Papelbon in the final game of the set with Boston. They were struck by injuries again that weekend, as Doug Mientkiewicz was injured in a collision at first with Mike Lowell and Roger Clemens's first start was delayed by a groin injury. Nonetheless, the Yankees took 3 of 4 from the White Sox heading into an interleague series with the Pirates. Roger Clemens made his season debut on June 9 and earned the victory. The Yankees swept the Pirates and took a 9-game winning streak, their longest since May 2005, into a subway series with the Mets.  Roger Clemens pitched strongly in the series opener, but the Yankees were shut out 2–0.  The Yankees would rebound and take the next game 11–8.  Later that day, the Yankees received news that Kei Igawa would be ready to return to the Major Leagues.  On July 1, they were 11 games behind the division-leading Red Sox and 8 games behind the Wild Card-leading Tigers.

July
The Yankees began the first week of July strongly. They lost the final game of a series with Oakland before taking 3 out of 4 from the Minnesota Twins and 2 of 3 from the Los Angeles Angels of Anaheim. Alex Rodriguez was injured during the series with Minnesota, suffering a strained left hamstring. He missed one game before returning to action that weekend against the Angels. After winning the weekend series with the Angels, the Yankees went into the break with a 42–43 record and a 10-game deficit in the division behind the Boston Red Sox.  This is the first time since 1995 that the New York Yankees were under .500 before the All Star Break.
After the break, the Yankees took three out of four games from the Toronto Blue Jays and the last place Tampa Bay Devil Rays, twice. In the month of July, the Yankees traded Scott Proctor for Wilson Betemit of the Los Angeles Dodgers. The Yankees also traded Jeff Kennard for Jose Molina.

August
The beginning of August saw the Yankees, along with all of Major League Baseball, eagerly awaiting home run number 500 from Alex Rodriguez. During the home run milestone chase George Steinbrenner's health once again came into question when the New York Post and the New York Daily News each reported that Steinbrenner, during a recent interview, appeared to be suffering from dementia.

 On August 4, 2007, during the first inning Alex Rodriguez hit his 500th career home run. Rodriguez became the youngest player ever to do so at 32 years, 8 days.  On August 6, 2007, the Yankees cut relief pitcher Mike Myers and brought up Jim Brower. They had just completed a season sweep of the Cleveland Indians, winning all 6 games they played against them in 2007. This was a good start to the Yankees' upcoming tough schedule, where they played 17 games out of a 20-game span against playoff contenders. This included 8 games against the Detroit Tigers (4 at home, 4 at Detroit), 3 games against the Cleveland Indians, 3 games against the Los Angeles Angels of Anaheim, and 3 games against the Boston Red Sox.

August also saw rookie Phil Hughes rejoin the starting rotation, as well as the much anticipated debut of Joba Chamberlain, a future starter who gave the Yankees' bullpen some much needed help during the pennant race (an 0.38 ERA in 23.2 innings).

Hall of Fame Yankee shortstop Phil Rizzuto, who was also the long-time voice of the Yankees on television and radio, died on August 13. The Yankees wore his number 10 on their left sleeves for the remainder of the season.

The Yankees swept Boston at Yankee Stadium after dropping to eight games back in AL East standings. Coupled with losses by the Seattle Mariners, the Yankees' wins put them on top of the AL Wild Card race.

September
The Yankees' first game of September showcased rookie pitcher Ian Kennedy in his first career Major League start. Kennedy had replaced veteran Mike Mussina after Mussina had struggled in his previous three starts. Over seven innings pitched, Kennedy was charged with three runs, only one of which was earned, and the Yankees' offense was led by Alex Rodriguez's 45th home run of the season on the way to a 9–6 victory over the Tampa Bay Devil Rays. The game against the Boston Red Sox on September 14 was 4 hours and 43 minutes, 2 minutes short of a nine inning game record, which is held by the Yankees and Red Sox. While the Yankees lost the American League East title to the Boston Red Sox on September 27, the Yankees clinched the wild card berth and appeared in the postseason for a 13th straight year. They faced the AL Central champions, the Cleveland Indians, in the ALDS, losing the series three games to one.

Season standings

Record vs. opponents

Roster

Game log

|- style="background-color:#bbffbb"
| 1 || April 2 || Devil Rays || 9–5  || Vizcaíno (1–0) || Stokes (0–1) ||  || 55,035 || 1–0
|- style="background-color:#bbbbbb"
| -- || April 4 || Devil Rays || colspan=5|Postponed (rain)  || 1–0
|- style="background-color:#ffbbbb"
| 2 || April 5 || Devil Rays || 7–6  || Lugo (1–0) ||  Vizcaíno (1–1) || Reyes (1) || 52,096 || 1–1
|- style="background-color:#ffbbbb"
| 3 || April 6 || Orioles || 6–4  || Loewen (1–0) || Mussina (0–1) || Ray (1) || 50,074 || 1–2
|- style="background-color:#bbffbb"
| 4 || April 7 || Orioles || 10 – 7 || Rivera (1–0) ||Ray (0–1) || || 50,510 || 2–2
|- style="background-color:#ffbbbb"
| 5 || April 8 || Orioles || 6–4  || Bédard (1–1) || Rasner (0–1) || Ray (2) || 47,679 || 2–3
|- style="background-color:#bbffbb"
| 6 || April 9 || @ Twins || 8–2  || Pavano (1–0) || Ponson (0–1) || || 26,047 || 3–3
|- style="background-color:#bbffbb"
| 7 || April 10 || @ Twins || 10 – 1 || Pettitte (1–0) || Bonser (0–1)  || || 24,552 || 4–3
|- style="background-color:#ffbbbb"
| 8 || April 11 || @ Twins || 5–1   || Ortiz (2–0) || Farnsworth (0–1) || || 30,131 || 4–4
|- style="background-color:#ffbbbb"
| 9 || April 13 || @ Athletics || 5–4   || Street (2–1) || Bruney (0–1) || || 35,077 || 4–5
|- style="background-color:#bbffbb"
| 10 || April 14 || @ Athletics || 4–3   || Bruney (1–1) || DiNardo (0–1) || || 35,077 || 5–5
|- style="background-color:#ffbbbb"
| 11 || April 15 || @ Athletics || 5–4  || Marshall (1–0) || Rivera (1–1) || || 35,077 || 5–6
|- style="background-color:#bbffbb"
| 12 || April 17 || Indians || 10 – 3 || Wright (1–0) || Westbrook (0–2) || || 38,438 || 6–6
|- style="background-color:#bbffbb"
| 13 || April 18 || Indians || 9–2  || Igawa (1–0) || Sowers (0–1) || || 41,379 || 7–6
|- style="background-color:#bbffbb"
| 14 || April 19 || Indians || 8–6  || Henn (1–0) || Borowski (0–1) || || 48,072 || 8–6
|- style="background-color:#ffbbbb"
| 15 || April 20 || @ Red Sox || 7–6  || Snyder (1–0) || Rivera (1–2) || Okajima (1) || 36,786 || 8–7
|- style="background-color:#ffbbbb"
| 16 || April 21 || @ Red Sox || 7–5  || Beckett (4–0) || Karstens (0–1) || Papelbon (5) || 36,342 || 8–8
|- style="background-color:#ffbbbb"
| 17 || April 22 || @ Red Sox || 7–6  || Matsuzaka (2–2) || Proctor (0–1) || Papelbon (6) || 36,905 || 8–9
|- style="background-color:#ffbbbb"
| 18 || April 23 || @ Devil Rays || 10 – 8 || Fossum (2–1) || Igawa (1–1) || || 20,409 || 8–10
|- style="background-color:#ffbbbb"
| 19 || April 24 || @ Devil Rays || 6–4  || Salas (1–1) || Wang (0–1) || Reyes (7) || 22,328 ||8–11
|- style="background-color:#bbbbbb"
| -- || April 25 || Blue Jays || colspan=5|Postponed (rain)  ||8–11
|- style="background-color:#ffbbbb"
| 20 || April 26 || Blue Jays || 6–0  || Burnett (2–0) || Hughes (0–1) || || 45,118 || 8–12
|- style="background-color:#ffbbbb"
| 21 || April 27 || Red Sox || 11 – 4 || Matsuzaka (3–2) || Pettitte (1–1) || || 55,005 || 8–13
|- style="background-color:#bbffbb"
| 22 || April 28 || Red Sox || 3–1  || Igawa (2–1)  || Wakefield (2–3) || Rivera (1) || 55,026 || 9–13
|- style="background-color:#ffbbbb"
| 23 || April 29 || Red Sox || 7–4  || Tavárez (1–2) || Wang (0–2) || Papelbon (8) || 54,856 || 9–14 

|- style="background-color:#bbffbb"
| 24 || May 1 || @ Rangers || 10 – 1 || Hughes (1–1) ||  Loe (1–2) || || 32,310 || 10–14
|- style="background-color:#bbbbbb"
| -- || May 2 || @ Rangers || colspan=5|Postponed (rain)  || 10–14
|- style="background-color:#bbffbb"
| 25 || May 3 || @ Rangers || 4–3  || Vizcaíno (2–1) || Benoit (0–1) || Rivera (2) || ----- || 11–14
|- style="background-color:#bbffbb"
| 26 || May 3 || @ Rangers || 5–2  || Mussina (1–1) || Tejeda (3–2) || Rivera (3) || 40,671 || 12–14
|- style="background-color:#ffbbbb"
| 27 || May 4 || Mariners || 15 – 11 || O'Flaherty (1–0) || Bean (0–1) || Putz (6) || 49,519 || 12–15
|- style="background-color:#bbffbb"
| 28 || May 5 || Mariners || 8–1  || Wang (1–2) || Weaver (0–5) || || 51,702 || 13–15
|- style="background-color:#bbffbb"
| 29 || May 6 || Mariners || 5–0  || Rasner (1–1) || Washburn (2–3) || || 52,553 || 14–15
|- style="background-color:#ffbbbb"
| 30 || May 7 || Mariners || 3–2  || Sherrill (1–0) || Rivera (1–3) || Putz (7) || 47,424 || 14–16
|- style="background-color:#bbffbb"
| 31 || May 8 || Rangers || 8–2  || Pettitte (2–1) || Wood (2–1) || || 50,705 || 15–16
|- style="background-color:#bbffbb"
| 32 || May 9 || Rangers || 6–2  || Mussina (2–1) || Tejeda (3–3) || || 47,930 || 16–16
|- style="background-color:#ffbbbb"
| 33 || May 10 || Rangers || 14 – 2 || McCarthy (2–4) || Wang (1–3) || || 52,147 || 16–17
|- style="background-color:#ffbbbb"
| 34 || May 11 || @ Mariners || 3–0  || Washburn (3–3) || Rasner (1–2) || Putz (8) || 44,214 || 16–18
|- style="background-color:#bbffbb"
| 35 || May 12 || @ Mariners || 7–2  || DeSalvo (1–0) || M. Batista (3–3) || || 46,153 || 17–18
|- style="background-color:#ffbbbb"
| 36 || May 13 || @ Mariners || 2–1  || Ramírez (3–2) || Pettitte (2–2) || Putz (9) || 46,181 || 17–19
|- style="background-color:#bbbbbb"
| -- || May 15 || @ White Sox || colspan=5|Postponed (rain)  || 17–19
|- style="background-color:#ffbbbb"
| 37 || May 16 || @ White Sox || 5–3  || Danks (2–4) || Mussina (2–2) || Thornton (1) || 30,953 || 17–20
|- style="background-color:#bbffbb"
| 38 || May 16 || @ White Sox || 8–1  || Wang (2–3) || Contreras (3–4) || || 34,609 || 18–20
|- style="background-color:#ffbbbb"
| 39 || May 17 || @ White Sox || 4–1  || Garland (3–2) || DeSalvo (1–1) || Jenks (13) || 30,488 || 18–21
|- style="background-color:#ffbbbb"
| 40 || May 18 || @ Mets || 3–2  || Pérez (5–3) || Pettitte (2–3) || B. Wagner (10) || 56,337 || 18–22
|- style="background-color:#ffbbbb"
| 41 || May 19 || @ Mets || 10 – 7 || Glavine (5–1) || Rasner (1–3) || || 56,137 || 18–23
|- style="background-color:#bbffbb"
| 42 || May 20 || @ Mets || 6–2  || Clippard (1–0) || Maine (5–2) || || 56,438 || 19–23
|- style="background-color:#bbffbb"
| 43 || May 21 || Red Sox || 6–2  || Wang (3–3) || Wakefield (4–5) || || 55,078 || 20–23
|- style="background-color:#ffbbbb"
| 44 || May 22 || Red Sox || 7–3  || Tavárez (2–4) || Mussina (2–3) || || 54,739 || 20–24
|- style="background-color:#bbffbb"
| 45 || May 23 || Red Sox || 8–3  || Pettitte (3–3) || Schilling (4–2) || || 55,000 || 21–24
|- style="background-color:#ffbbbb"
| 46 || May 25 || Angels || 10 – 6 || Weaver (4–3) || Clippard (1–1) || || 50,363 || 21–25
|- style="background-color:#ffbbbb"
| 47 || May 26 || Angels || 3–1  || Escobar (6–2) || Wang (3–4) || Rodríguez (15) || 52,536 || 21–26
|- style="background-color:#ffbbbb"
| 48 || May 27 || Angels || 4–3  || Lackey (8–3) || Proctor (0–2) || Rodríguez (16) || 53,508 || 21–27
|- style="background-color:#ffbbbb"
| 49 || May 28 || @ Blue Jays || 7–2  || McGowan (1–2) || DeSalvo (1–2) || || 28,791 || 21–28
|- style="background-color:#ffbbbb"
| 50 || May 29 || @ Blue Jays || 3–2  || Accardo (1–0) || Pettitte (3–4) || || 30,116 || 21–29
|- style="background-color:#bbffbb"
| 51 || May 30 || @ Blue Jays || 10 – 5 || Clippard (2–1) || Litsch (1–2) || Rivera (4) || 29,187 || 22–29

|- style="background-color:#bbffbb"
| 52 || June 1 || @ Red Sox || 9–5  || Wang (4–4) || Wakefield (5–6) || || 36,785 || 23–29
|- style="background-color:#ffbbbb"
| 53 || June 2 || @ Red Sox || 11 – 6 || Okajima (1–0) || Proctor (0–3) || || 36,294 || 23–30
|- style="background-color:#bbffbb"
| 54 || June 3 || @ Red Sox || 6–5  || Bruney (2–1) || Papelbon (0–1) || Rivera (5) || 36,793 || 24–30
|- style="background-color:#ffbbbb"
| 55 || June 4 || @ White Sox || 6–4  || Garland (4–3) || DeSalvo (1–3) || Jenks (16) || 32,703 || 24–31
|- style="background-color:#bbffbb"
| 56 || June 5 || @ White Sox || 7–3  || Clippard (3–1) || Buehrle (2–3) || Rivera (6) || 30,895 || 25–31
|- style="background-color:#bbffbb"
| 57 || June 6 || @ White Sox || 5–1  || Wang (5–4) || Vázquez (3–4) || || 30,829 || 26–31
|- style="background-color:#bbffbb"
| 58 || June 7 || @ White Sox || 10 – 3 || Proctor (1–3) || Contreras (4–6) || Rivera (7) || 32,688 || 27–31
|- style="background-color:#bbffbb"
| 59 || June 8 || Pirates || 5–4   || Rivera (2–3) || Capps (3–3) || || 54,240 || 28–31
|- style="background-color:#bbffbb"
| 60 || June 9 || Pirates || 9–3  || Clemens (1–0) || Maholm (2–9) || || 54,296 || 29–31
|- style="background-color:#bbffbb"
| 61 || June 10 || Pirates || 13 – 6 || Henn (2–0) || Chacón (2–1) || || 54,292 || 30–31
|- style="background-color:#bbffbb"
| 62 || June 12 || D-backs || 4–1  || Wang (6–4) || Webb (6–4) || Rivera (8) || 51,577 || 31–31
|- style="background-color:#bbffbb"
| 63 || June 13 || D-backs || 7–2  || Mussina (3–3) || Hernández (5–4) || || 53,891 || 32–31
|- style="background-color:#bbffbb"
| 64 || June 14 || D-backs || 7–1  || Pettitte (4–4) || Davis (4–8) || || 53,712 || 33–31
|- style="background-color:#ffbbbb"
| 65 || June 15 || Mets || 2–0  || Pérez (7–5) || Clemens (1–1) ||  Wagner (15) || 55,159 || 33–32
|- style="background-color:#bbffbb"
| 66 || June 16 || Mets || 11 – 8 || Vizcaíno (3–1) || Glavine (5–5) || || 55,064 || 34–32
|- style="background-color:#bbffbb"
| 67 || June 17 || Mets || 8–2   ||  Wang (7–4) || Hernández (3–3) || ||55,060 || 35–32
|- style="background-color:#ffbbbb"
| 68 || June 19 || @ Rockies || 3–1  || Fogg (3–5) || Mussina (3–4) || Fuentes (19) || 48,077 || 35–33
|- style="background-color:#ffbbbb"
| 69 || June 20 || @ Rockies || 6–1  || Francis (7–5) || Pettitte (4–5) || || 48,440 || 35–34
|- style="background-color:#ffbbbb"
| 70 || June 21 || @ Rockies || 4–3  || López (4–0) || Clemens (1–2) || Fuentes (20) || 48,611 || 35–35
|- style="background-color:#bbffbb"
| 71 || June 22 || @ Giants  || 7–3  || L. Vizcaíno (4–1) || Cain (2–8) || Rivera (9) || 43,425 || 36–35
|- style="background-color:#ffbbbb"
| 72 || June 23 || @ Giants || 6–5   || Chulk (2–2) || Proctor (1–4) || || 43,485 || 36–36
|- style="background-color:#ffbbbb"
| 73 || June 24 || @ Giants || 7–2  || Lowry (7–6) || Mussina (3–5) || || 43,503 || 36–37
|- style="background-color:#ffbbbb"
| 74 || June 26 || @ Orioles || 3–2  || Ray (4–5) || Proctor (1–5) || || 39,934 || 36–38
|- style="background-color:#ffbbbb"
| 75 || June 27 || @ Orioles || 4–0  || Bédard (6–4) || Clemens (1–3) || || 35,776 || 36–39
|- style="background-color:#bbffbb"
| 76 || June 28 || @ Orioles || 8–7 * || Myers (1–0) || Parrish (2–1) || Rivera (10) || 40,737 || 37–39
|- style="background-color:#bbffbb"
| 77 || June 29 || Athletics || 2–1  || Mussina (4–5) || Kennedy (2–6) || Rivera (11) || 52,622 || 38–39
|- style="background-color:#ffbbbb"
| 78 || June 30 || Athletics || 7–0  || Gaudin (7–3) || Igawa (2–2) || || 54,150 || 38–40
|-
| colspan=8 | *Game suspended, completed July 27

|- style="background-color:#ffbbbb"
| 79 || July 1 || Athletics || 11 – 5 || Haren (10–2) || Pettitte (4–6) || || 54,266 || 38–41
|- style="background-color:#bbffbb"
| 80 || July 2 || Twins || 5–1  || Clemens (2–3) || Bonser (1–5) || || 53,036 || 39–41
|- style="background-color:#bbffbb"
| 81 || July 3 || Twins || 8–0  || Wang (8–4) || Silva (6–9) || || 53,862 || 40–41
|- style="background-color:#ffbbbb"
| 82 || July 4 || Twins || 6–2  || Santana (10–6) || Mussina (4–6) || || 52,040 || 40–42
|- style="background-color:#bbffbb"
| 83 || July 5 || Twins || 7–6  || Farnsworth (1–1) || Neshek (3–1) || Rivera (12) || 52,471 || 41–42
|- style="background-color:#bbffbb"
| 84 || July 6 || Angels || 14 – 9 || Ramírez (1–0) || Bootcheck (2–2) || || 52,059 || 42–42
|- style="background-color:#ffbbbb"
| 85 || July 7 || Angels || 2–1   || Rodríguez (2–2) || Vizcaíno (4–2) || || 54,497 || 42–43
|- style="background-color:#bbffbb"
| 86 || July 8 || Angels || 12 – 0 || Wang (9–4) || Santana (5–10) || || 53,921 || 43–43
|- style="background-color:#bbffbb"
| 87 || July 12 || @ Devil Rays || 7–3  || Pettitte (5–6) || Shields (7–5) || || 21,907 || 44–43
|- style="background-color:#ffbbbb"
| 88 || July 13 || @ Devil Rays || 6–4  || Kazmir (6–6) || Clemens (2–4) || Glover (2) || 29,803 || 44–44
|- style="background-color:#bbffbb"
| 89 || July 14 || @ Devil Rays || 6–4  || Wang (10–4) || Sonnanstine (1–4) || Rivera (13) || 36,048 || 45–44
|- style="background-color:#bbffbb"
| 90 || July 15 || @ Devil Rays || 7–6  || Vizcaíno (5–2) || Fossum (5–8) || Rivera (14) || 36,048 || 46–44
|- style="background-color:#bbffbb"
| 91 || July 16 || Blue Jays || 6–4  ||  Proctor (2–5) || Towers (4–6) || Rivera (15) || 52,993 || 47–44
|- style="background-color:#bbffbb"
| 92 || July 17 || Blue Jays || 3–2   || Vizcaíno (6–2) || Janssen (2–2) || || 51,961 || 48–44
|- style="background-color:#bbffbb"
| 93 || July 18 || Blue Jays || 6–1  || Myers (2–0) || Marcum (5–4) || Rivera (16) || 52,147 || 49–44
|- style="background-color:#ffbbbb"
| 94 || July 19 || Blue Jays || 3–2  || McGowan (6–5) || Wang (10–5) || Accardo (14) || 53,857 || 49–45
|- style="background-color:#ffbbbb"
| 95 || July 20 || Devil Rays || 14 – 4 || Jackson (2–9) || Mussina (4–7) || || 53,957 || 49–46
|- style="background-color:#bbffbb"
| 96 || July 21 || Devil Rays || 7–3  || Vizcaíno (7–2) || Ryu (1–2) || || 54,412 || 50–46
|- style="background-color:#bbffbb"
| 97 || July 21 || Devil Rays || 17 – 5 || Vizcaíno (8–2) || Howell (1–4) || || 52,983 || 51–46
|- style="background-color:#bbffbb"
| 98 || July 22 || Devil Rays || 21 – 4 || Pettitte (6–6) || Shields (8–6) || || 54,751 || 52–46
|- style="background-color:#bbffbb"
| 99 || July 23 || @ Royals || 9–2  || Clemens (3–4) || Pérez (5–9) || || 30,746 || 53–46
|- style="background-color:#bbffbb"
| 100 || July 24 || @ Royals || 9–4  || Wang (11–5) || Elarton (2–4) || || 38,212 || 54–46
|- style="background-color:#bbffbb"
| 101 || July 25 || @ Royals || 7–1  || Mussina (5–7) || Meche (7–7) || || 28,460 || 55–46
|- style="background-color:#ffbbbb"
| 102 || July 26 || @ Royals || 7–0  || de la Rosa (8–10) || Igawa (2–3) || || 37,036 || 55–47
|- style="background-color:#ffbbbb"
| 103 || July 27 || @ Orioles || 4–2  || Guthrie (7–3) || Pettitte (6–7) || Bradford (1) || 47,952 || 55–48
|- style="background-color:#ffbbbb"
| 104 || July 28 || @ Orioles || 7–5  || Burres (5–4) || Clemens (3–5) || Walker (3) || 48,402 || 55–49
|- style="background-color:#bbffbb"
| 105 || July 29 || @ Orioles || 10 – 6 || Wang (12–5) || Cabrera (7–11) || || 47,936 || 56–49
|- style="background-color:#bbffbb"
| 106 || July 31 || White Sox || 16 – 3 || Mussina (6–7) || Contreras (5–14) || || 53,958 || 57–49

|- style="background-color:#bbffbb"
| 107 || August 1 || White Sox || 8–1  || Pettitte (7–7) || Danks (6–8) || || 53,342 || 58–49
|- style="background-color:#ffbbbb"
| 108 || August 2 || White Sox || 13 – 9 || Logan (2–0) || Karstens (0–2) || ||  54,869  || 58–50
|- style="background-color:#bbffbb"
| 109 || August 3 || Royals || 7–1  || Wang (13–5) || Pérez (6–10) || || 54,246 || 59–50
|- style="background-color:#bbffbb"
| 110 || August 4 || Royals || 16 – 8 || Myers (3–0) || Bale (0–1) || || 54,026 || 60–50
|- style="background-color:#bbffbb"
| 111 || August 5 || Royals || 8–5  || Mussina (7–7) || Meche (7–9) || Rivera (17) || 54,525 || 61–50
|- style="background-color:#bbffbb"
| 112 || August 6 || @ Blue Jays || 5–4  || Pettitte (8–7) || Downs (1–2) || Rivera (18) || 42,714 || 62–50
|- style="background-color:#bbffbb"
| 113 || August 7 || @ Blue Jays || 9–2  || Clemens (4–5) || Towers (5–9) || || 38,078 || 63–50
|- style="background-color:#ffbbbb"
| 114 || August 8 || @ Blue Jays || 15 – 4 || Halladay (13–5) || Wang (13–6) || || 40,811 || 63–51
|- style="background-color:#bbffbb"
| 115 || August 10 || @ Indians || 6–1  || Hughes (2–1) || Carmona (13–7) || || 41,675 || 64–51
|- style="background-color:#bbffbb"
| 116 || August 11 || @ Indians || 11 – 2 || Mussina (8–7) || Byrd (10–5) || || 41,799 || 65–51
|- style="background-color:#bbffbb"
| 117 || August 12 || @ Indians || 5–3  || Pettitte (9–7)  || Westbrook (3–7) || Rivera (19) || 41,612 || 66–51
|- style="background-color:#bbffbb"
| 118 || August 13 || Orioles || 7–6  || Rivera (3–3) || Bradford (1–5) || || 54,398 || 67–51
|- style="background-color:#ffbbbb"
| 119 || August 14 || Orioles || 12 – 0 || Cabrera (9–12) || Karstens (0–3) || || 52,567 || 67–52
|- style="background-color:#ffbbbb"
| 120 || August 15 || Orioles || 6–3   || Bradford (2–5) || Rivera (3–4) || || 53,363 || 67–53
|- style="background-color:#ffbbbb"
| 121 || August 16 || Tigers || 8–5  || Verlander (13–4) || Mussina (8–8) || || 53,914 || 67–54
|- style="background-color:#bbffbb"
| 122 || August 17 || Tigers || 6–1  || Pettitte (10–7) || Robertson (7–10) || || 54,290 || 68–54
|- style="background-color:#bbffbb"
| 123 || August 18 || Tigers || 5–2  || Clemens (5–5) || Durbin (7–6) || Rivera (20) || 54,702 || 69–54
|- style="background-color:#bbffbb"
| 124 || August 19 || Tigers || 9–3  || Wang (14–6) || Bonderman (10–6) ||Ramírez (1) || 55,071 || 70–54
|- style="background-color:#ffbbbb"
| 125 || August 20 || @ Angels || 7–6  || Oliver (1–0) || Henn (2–1) || || 44,249 || 70–55
|- style="background-color:#ffbbbb"
| 126 || August 21 || @ Angels || 18 – 9 || Escobar (14–6) || Mussina (8–9) || Gwyn (1) || 44,264 || 70–56
|- style="background-color:#bbffbb"
| 127 || August 22 || @ Angels || 8–2  || Pettitte (11–7) || Lackey (15–8) || || 44,326 || 71–56
|- style="background-color:#ffbbbb"
| 128 || August 24 || @ Tigers || 9–6   || Durbin (8–6)  || Henn (2–2) || || 44,163 || 71–57
|- style="background-color:#bbffbb"
| 129 || August 25 || @ Tigers || 7–2  || Wang (15–6) || Bonderman (10–7) || || 44,250 || 72–57
|- style="background-color:#ffbbbb"
| 130 || August 26 || @ Tigers || 5–4  || Seay (1–0) || Hughes (2–2) || Jones (33) || 43,268 || 72–58
|- style="background-color:#ffbbbb"
| 131 || August 27 || @ Tigers || 16 – 0 || Verlander (14–5) || Mussina (8–10) || || 42,428 || 72–59
|- style="background-color:#bbffbb"
| 132 || August 28 || Red Sox || 5–3  || Pettitte (12–7) || Matsuzaka (13–11) || Rivera (21) || 55,037 || 73–59
|- style="background-color:#bbffbb"
| 133 || August 29 || Red Sox || 4–3  || Clemens (6–5) || Beckett (16–6) || Rivera (22) || 54,986 || 74–59
|- style="background-color:#bbffbb"
| 134 || August 30 || Red Sox || 5–0  || Wang (16–6) || Schilling (8–6) || || 55,067 || 75–59
|- style="background-color:#ffbbbb"
| 135 || August 31 || Devil Rays || 9–1  || Sonnanstine (4–9) || Hughes (2–3) || || 53,275 || 75–60

|- style="background-color:#bbffbb"
| 136 || September 1 || Devil Rays || 9–6  || Kennedy (1–0) || Jackson (4–13) || Rivera (23) || 53,637 || 76–60
|- style="background-color:#ffbbbb"
| 137 || September 2 || Devil Rays || 8–2  || Hammel (2–4) || Pettitte (12–8) || || 53,957 || 76–61
|- style="background-color:#ffbbbb"
| 138 || September 3 || Mariners || 7–1  || Hernández (11–7) || Clemens (6–6) || || 54,522 || 76–62
|- style="background-color:#bbffbb"
| 139 || September 4 || Mariners || 12 – 3 || Wang (17–6) || Ramírez (8–5) || || 52,487 || 77–62
|- style="background-color:#bbffbb"
| 140 || September 5 || Mariners || 10 – 2 || Chamberlain (1–0) || Washburn (9–13) || || 52,538 || 78–62
|- style="background-color:#bbffbb"
| 141 || September 7 || @ Royals || 3–2  || Farnsworth (2–1) || Musser (0–1) || Rivera (24) || 27,462 || 79–62
|- style="background-color:#bbffbb"
| 142 || September 8 || @ Royals || 11 – 5 || Pettitte (13–8) || Bannister (12–8) || || 35,518 || 80–62
|- style="background-color:#bbffbb"
| 143 || September 9 || @ Royals || 6–3  || Wang (18–6)  || Duckworth (2–5) || Rivera (25) || 24,910 || 81–62
|- style="background-color:#bbffbb"
| 144 || September 11 || @ Blue Jays || 9–2  || Hughes (3–3) || Marcum (12–6) || || 30,472 || 82–62
|- style="background-color:#bbffbb"
| 145 || September 12 || @ Blue Jays || 4–1  || Mussina (9–10) || McGowan (10–9) || Rivera (26) || 27,082  || 83–62
|- style="background-color:#ffbbbb"
| 146 || September 13 || @ Blue Jays || 2–1  || Downs (3–2) || Britton (0–1) || || 32,632 || 83–63
|- style="background-color:#bbffbb"
| 147 || September 14 || @ Red Sox || 8–7  || Bruney (3–1) || Papelbon (1–3) || Rivera (27) || 36,590 || 84–63
|- style="background-color:#ffbbbb"
| 148 || September 15 || @ Red Sox || 10 – 1 || Beckett (19–6) || Wang (18–7) || || 36,215 || 84–64
|- style="background-color:#bbffbb"
| 149 || September 16 || @ Red Sox || 4–3  || Chamberlain (2–0) || Schilling (8–8) || Rivera (28) || 36,533 || 85–64
|- style="background-color:#bbffbb"
| 150 || September 17 || Orioles || 8–5   || Hughes (4–3) || Cabrera (9–17) || Rivera (29) || 52,548 || 86–64
|- style="background-color:#bbffbb"
| 151 || September 18 || Orioles || 12 – 0 || Mussina (10–10) || Leicester (2–2) || || 52,685 || 87–64
|- style="background-color:#bbffbb"
| 152 || September 19 || Orioles || 2–1  || Pettitte (14–8) || Burres (6–6) || Rivera (30) || 53,857 || 88–64
|- style="background-color:#ffbbbb"
| 153 || September 21 || Blue Jays || 5–4   || Kennedy (4–9) || Bruney (3–2) || Frasor (3) || 54,151 || 88–65
|- style="background-color:#bbffbb"
| 154 || September 22 || Blue Jays || 12–11  || Karstens (1–3) || Towers (5–10) || || 54,887 || 89–65
|- style="background-color:#bbffbb"
| 155 || September 23 || Blue Jays || 7–5  || Mussina (11–10) || McGowan (11–10) || Chamberlain (1) || 54,983 || 90–65
|- style="background-color:#ffbbbb"
| 156 || September 24 || Blue Jays || 4–1  || Litsch (7–9) || Pettitte (14–9) || Janssen (6) || 53,261 || 90–66
|- style="background-color:#ffbbbb"
| 157 || September 25 || @ Devil Rays || 7–6   || Glover (6–5) || Karstens (1–4) || || 24,503 || 90–67
|- style="background-color:#bbffbb"
| 158 || September 26 || @ Devil Rays || 12 – 4 || Wang (19–7) || Howell (1–6) || || 21,621 || 91–67
|- style="background-color:#bbffbb"
| 159 || September 27 || @ Devil Rays || 3–1  || Hughes (5–3) || Switzer (0–2) || Veras (1) || 28,962 || 92–67
|- style="background-color:#ffbbbb"
| 160 || September 28 || @ Orioles || 10 – 9  || Bradford (4–7) || Ramírez (1–1) || || 38,113 || 92–68
|- style="background-color:#bbffbb"
| 161 || September 29 || @ Orioles || 11 – 10 || Pettitte (15–9) || Cabrera (9–15) || Veras (2) || 47,616 || 93–68
|- style="background-color:#bbffbb"
| 162 || September 30 || @ Orioles || 10 – 4 || Wright (2–0) || Burres (6–8) || || 43,589 || 94–68

Playoffs

ALDS vs. Cleveland Indians
2007 American League Division Series:

End of an era
On October 14, 2007, George Steinbrenner relinquished control of the Yankees to his two sons, Hank and Hal Steinbrenner. The brothers will take on control not only of the Yankees but also the YES Network and the construction of the new Yankee Stadium. 
"I'll pay more attention to the baseball part", Hank Steinbrenner said. "The stadium, that's more Hal. But basically everything will be decided jointly." Technically, Steinbrenner is not completely gone. He has given himself chairman-like position on the team. "George has taken on a role like the chairman of a major corporation", team president Randy Levine told the New York Post.  "He's been saying for years he's wanted to get his sons involved in the family business. Both of them have stepped up and are taking on the day-to-day duties of what's required to run the Yankees."

After the Yankees were eliminated the postseason, the fate of Joe Torre, the Yankees' manager since 1996, was in question. The team mulled what to do while speculation grew that Torre would not be brought back as manager. The team eventually offered him a contract that had a reduced salary with incentives, but Torre, who felt he was being treated unfairly even after his long tenure with the team, rejected the offer. He subsequently was hired by the Los Angeles Dodgers. The Yankees would hire Joe Girardi as Torre's replacement.

Player stats
For complete stats click here (external link)

Batting

Note: G = Games played; AB = At bats; H = Hits; AVG = Batting average; HR = Home runs; RBI = Runs batted in

Pitching

Starting and other pitchers
Note: G = Games pitched; IP = Innings pitched; W = Wins; L = Losses; ERA = Earned run average; SO = Strikeouts

Relief pitchers
Note: G = Games pitched; IP = Innings pitched; SV = Saves; W = Wins; L = Losses; H = Holds; ERA = Earned run average; SO = Strikeouts

*Ended season not on active roster 
+ Ended season playing for different team

Farm system

LEAGUE CHAMPIONS: GCL Yankees

References

Game Logs:
1st Half: New York Yankees Game Log on ESPN.com
2nd Half: New York Yankees Game Log on ESPN.com
Batting Statistics: New York Yankees Batting Stats on ESPN.com
Pitching Statistics: New York Yankees Pitching Stats on ESPN.com

2007 New York Yankees at Baseball Reference
2007 New York Yankees team page at www.baseball-almanac.com

New York Yankees seasons
New York Yankees
New York Yankees
2000s in the Bronx